In enzymology, an amygdalin beta-glucosidase is an enzyme that catalyzes the chemical reaction

(R)-amygdalin + H2O  (R)-prunasin + D-glucose

Thus, the two substrates of this enzyme are (R)-amygdalin and H2O, whereas its two products are (R)-prunasin and D-glucose.

This enzyme belongs to the family of hydrolases, specifically those glycosidases that hydrolyse O- and S-glycosyl compounds.  The systematic name of this enzyme class is amygdalin beta-D-glucohydrolase. Other names in common use include amygdalase, amygdalinase, amygdalin hydrolase, and amygdalin glucosidase.

It can be completely inhibited by the action of Glucono delta-lactone at 1 mM concentration.

References

 

EC 3.2.1
Enzymes of unknown structure